Dabney Tyler Smith (born December 7, 1953) is the fifth and current bishop of the Episcopal Diocese of Southwest Florida.

Biography 
Smith was born in Texas and raised in Florida, where his father, Dorsey Smith, served as priest. He received a doctorate of ministry from Seabury-Western Theological Seminary in 1999. He also has degrees from the University of South Florida and Nashotah House, where he serves on the board of trustees. He also serves on the Board of Regents of Sewanee: The University of the South.

He was consecrated on March 10, 2007 at the Cathedral of St. Jude the Apostle in St. Petersburg. (Saint Jude, a Catholic cathedral, had a larger seating capacity than the Episcopal Cathedral Church of Saint Peter.) On May 1, 2015, he was nominated for presiding bishop of The Episcopal Church.

See also

 List of Episcopal bishops of the United States
 Historical list of the Episcopal bishops of the United States

References

1953 births
Living people
Nashotah House alumni
University of South Florida alumni
Seabury-Western Theological Seminary alumni
Sewanee: The University of the South faculty
Place of birth missing (living people)
Episcopal bishops of Southwest Florida